Rudolph Foods is a Lima, Ohio-based producer of snack food, in particular pork rinds and cracklings. The company has six facilities in the United States and three international ventures. It was founded in 1955 by John Rudolph.

Brands and products
In addition to Rudolph Foods' primary business of traditional pork rinds and cracklings, Rudolph Foods also manufactures Cinnamon Churros, Original OnYums, and Chile Limon Chicharinas. Its brands include Rudolph's, Southern Recipe, Pepe's El Original, Gaslamp Popcorn, and Lee's Pig Skins.

Southern Recipe
Southern Recipe manufactures Southern-inspired snacks including pork rinds and cracklings. Southern Recipe makes pork rinds and cracklings in various flavors.

Pepe's El Original
Pepe's El Original is an authentic Mexican food and snacks brand in the U.S. produced by Rudolph Foods Company. Pepe's El Original is Rudolph Foods’ oldest brand and first began production in San Antonio, Texas. The brand has a line of Chicharrones, cracklings, gigante, tender curls, and dippers. Additionally, the snack line offers other Hispanic-inspired snacks including sweet, cinnamon, and sugar churros and chile limon duros.

Lee's Pig Skins
Lee's Pig Skins offers pork rinds and cracklings prepared and packaged in the southern United States and is produced by Rudolph Foods Company. Lee's Pig Skins is based in New Hebron, Mississippi, and was founded in 1978 and incorporated in 1988. The brand produces Lee's Pig Skins, Dabo's and Papa Tubs pork rinds, pork strips, curls, cracklings, dippers, and washpot cracklings in various flavors.

Gaslamp Popcorn
Gaslamp Popcorn started making kettle corn in the historic Gaslamp district of San Diego in 1998. Gaslamp Popcorn makes four flavors: kettle corn, cinnamon caramel, olive oil and sea salt, and white cheddar. Gaslamp Popcorn is grown and popped in California.

Community
In 2010, Rudolph Foods sponsored the Pork Rind Heritage Festival.

Southern Recipe calls its online community of consumers “the man cave." This term stems from the brand's target consumer demographic, men from the southern US. In 2010, Southern Recipe hosted a social media contest, Win The Ultimate Man Cave, and sponsored a local Ohio team's participation in the World Championship Punkin Chunkin competition.

Pepe's El Original has sponsored Fiestas Patrias in Los Angeles. In 2010, Pepe's El Original hosted the contest Mi Amor, Mi Chicharrones in celebration of National Hispanic Heritage Month.

In 2010, Lee's Pig Skins sponsored the Smokin’ Pig Festival in Lake City, Florida and the Cracklin Festival in Port Barre, Louisiana.

Pork Rind Appreciation Day

In January 2011, Rudolph Foods declared "National Pork Rind Appreciation Day" to be observed each year on the same day as the NFL Super Bowl. Rudolph Foods agreed to make charitable donations in return for online support of the campaign. Ohio Governor John Kasich issued a letter of support for Pork Rind Appreciation Day on February 6, 2012.

Since 2012, Pork Rind Appreciation Day has supported Gridiron Greats Assistance Fund, a nonprofit organization that provides medical and financial assistance to former NFL players in need.

References

External links 
 Rudolph Foods Official Website

Food and drink companies based in Ohio
Food and drink companies established in 1955
1955 establishments in Ohio
Snack food manufacturers of the United States
Manufacturing companies based in Ohio
Lima, Ohio